Dhakaiya Kutti, also known as Old Dhakaiya or simply Dhakaiya, is a Bengali dialect, spoken by the original Dhakaiyas of Old Dhaka in Bangladesh. This language is largely intelligible with Standard Bengali but has some differences in vocabulary. It is not used in formal settings anymore although historically the local Bais and Bara  are said to have used it sometimes. Usage of the dialect is in decline as many families are opting to raise their children to speak in Standard Bengali due to it being the official medium in the country and the influence of Dhaka city as the capital, welcoming migrants from all over the country who are not familiar with their dialect.

Features
The dialect is an Eastern Bengali-based creole language with a large amount of Persian Language and some Hindustani vocabulary. It has only a few aspirated sounds in comparison to Standard Bengali. [gʱ], [tʃʰ], [d̪ʱ], [bʱ] sounds are not available in this language. The use of double sounds in certain words are also quite common. The word for younger brother-in-law, shala (শালা) in Standard Bengali and hala (হালা) in Dhakaiya and other Eastern dialects, is seen as offensive in almost all Bengali dialects except in the Dhakaiya dialect this is a common and inoffensive word which can be applied to teachers, parents and animals.

History

During the Mughal era, the Bengal Subah was famous for rice cultivation and the city of Jahangirnagar (now Dhaka) was the province's capital. Rice was a very important export product in the mid-eighteenth century, centred in Dhaka. The merchants who exported the rice were predominantly of Marwari and Central Indian descent. These merchants would go to different areas in Eastern Bengal and collect the rice. The rice was first needed to be cleaned up using  before packaging, and this process is called  (কুটা)  in Bengali. Many local rice cultivators were employed to do this. They would come from various parts of Bengal to Dhaka to complete this job, and as it was long and tiring to get there and do the job, many of them started living in Dhaka. This migration took place circa 1760. However, not all were involved in the rice trade. The interactions with different cultures and languages led to the birth of the Kutti language. The Bais  of Dhaka in the twentieth-century used to converse in either Dhakaiya Urdu or Dhakaiya Kutti. Eventually, the common people living in the localities of Old Dhaka, Kutti or not, used to speak in this dialect.

Presently, the Kutti speakers are a minority in Dhaka following the mass migration of Bengalis from districts all over Bengal during the first and second partitions during the British colonial period. The new educated migrant community (now also commonly known as Dhakaiyas with the former now being referred to as "Old Dhakaiyas") spoke in Standard Bengali, a standardised dialect of Bengali established by the British. Some of the Old Dhakaiya community began to see the new migrant community as their opponents due to these linguistic and cultural differences. This division was the source of modern troubles in the identities of the Old Dhakaiyas (who view themselves as original inhabitants) and the post-partition migrant community (who currently form the majority in the city).

Literature and media
There has been literature written in the Dhakaiya dialect. One popular poem is "Channi-poshor Raiter Lour" (চান্নিপশর রাইতের লৌড়) by Jewel Mazhar. Dhakaiya natoks are popular throughout the country and even the Indian filmmaker, Satyajit Ray, has written dialogues in this dialect. The Dhakaiya Kutti folk are renowned for "Kutti Jokes" and the dialect's humorous aspect in general; generally consisting of short stories in which Dhakaiyas mess around with the  gentry. It is considered to be one of the wittiest Bengali dialects. Generally referred to as "Dhakaiya" folk, they call outsiders or non-Dhakaiya Bengalis by the name "Gaiya" (গাঁইয়া), meaning from the village, and Kolkatans in particular as Demchi (ডেমচি).

Further reading
Bhuiyan, Mosarrof Hossain ঢাকাইয়া কুট্টি ভাষার অভিধান - Dictionary of words in Bengali dialect spoken in Dhaka City, popularly known as Dhakaiya Kutti Dialect. (Oitijjhya, 2015)

References

Old Dhaka
Languages of Bangladesh
Bengali dialects